Keith Frederick Savage (born 24 August 1940) is a former  international rugby union player.

He was capped thirteen times on the wing for England between 1966 and 1968. He scored one try for England. He was selected for the 1966 British Lions tour to Australia and New Zealand and the 1968 British Lions tour to South Africa. He did not play in any international matches on the 1966 tour but did play in all four internationals against  in 1968.He is Lion number 453

He played club rugby for Northampton and Leamington RFC.

Savage is now an English teacher in Johannesburg, South Africa.

References

1940 births
Living people
British & Irish Lions rugby union players from England
England international rugby union players
English rugby union players
South African schoolteachers
Loughborough Students RUFC players
Northampton Saints players
Rugby union players from Warwick
Rugby union wings